The London Declaration was a declaration issued by the 1949 Commonwealth Prime Ministers' Conference on the issue of India's continued membership of the Commonwealth of Nations, an association of independent states formerly part of the British Empire, after India's transition to a republican constitution. 

Drafted by the Indian statesman V. K. Krishna Menon, the declaration stated the agreement of the prime ministers to the continued membership of India in the organization after it becomes a republic. By that declaration, the Government of India had expressed its acceptance of the king as a symbol of the free association of its independent member nations and head of the Commonwealth.

The declaration dealt only with India, seen as an exceptional case, and it reaffirmed that the other members of the Commonwealth owed common allegiance to the Crown with an initial acceptance of the king as a head of the Commonwealth. However it did establish a precedent that republicanism is compatible with membership in the organization.

History 

The declaration stated vis-à-vis India:

This formula has since been deemed to be a sufficient precedent for all other countries.

The issue had been discussed at the 1948 Prime Ministers Conference, the agenda of which was dominated by the imminent decisions of two states—India and Ireland—to declare themselves republics. At the meeting, Indian Prime Minister Jawaharlal Nehru proposed a Ten Point Memorandum on the settlement between India and the Commonwealth. The Cabinet Committee on Commonwealth Relations recognised that Nehru's proposals could not constitute a basis for continued Commonwealth membership, and that a further conference would be required.

On 16 May 1949, during the Constituent Assembly Debates for the framing of a republican constitution, Nehru declared in the house that:

At the next conference, in April 1949, Nehru, seeking above all to avoid two-tiered membership, conceded a more agreeable three-point programme, based upon common Commonwealth citizenship, a declaration of India's continued membership, and recognition of the monarch in a separate capacity than that as monarch. This met general agreement, particularly with the new South African Prime Minister Daniel François Malan, and, over the next two days, the draft was crafted into a final agreement. To avoid criticisms about dropping the word British from the name of the Commonwealth, Nehru conceded a reference to the "British Commonwealth of Nations" in the opening paragraph of the document as an historically-appropriate reference.

King George VI was reticently in favour of the separation of the positions of king and Head of the Commonwealth, having met and liked Nehru, but was concerned with the practicalities. News of the agreement was hailed by all those on the opposition benches in the British House of Commons, including Winston Churchill and Clement Davies. By contrast, Jan Smuts, who had been defeated by Malan in the South African general election the previous year and was considered second only to Churchill as a Commonwealth statesman, was bitterly opposed. In the South African context, with which Smuts was mainly concerned, republicanism was mainly identified with Afrikaner conservatism and with tighter racial segregation. The London conference - concerned mainly with India and to some degree with Ireland, which recently declared itself a Republic - did not pay much attention for the implications for South Africa.

India became a republic in 1950 and remained in the Commonwealth. However, Ireland, which was in the same situation, having passed the Republic of Ireland Act 1948, declared itself a republic on 18 April 1949, ten days before the declaration, and therefore left the Commonwealth.

Appendix

Text of the Declaration

The Governments of the United Kingdom, Canada, Australia, New Zealand, South Africa, India, Pakistan and Ceylon, whose countries are united as Members of the British Commonwealth of Nations and owe a common allegiance to the Crown, which is also the symbol of their free association, have considered the impending constitutional changes in India.

The Government of India have informed the other Governments of the Commonwealth of the intention of the Indian people that under the new constitution which is about to be adopted India shall become a sovereign independent republic. The Government of India have however declared and affirmed India’s desire to continue her full membership of the Commonwealth of Nations and her acceptance of The King as the symbol of the free association of its independent member nations and as such the Head of the Commonwealth.

The Governments of the other countries of the Commonwealth, the basis of whose membership of the Commonwealth is not hereby changed, accept and recognise India’s continuing membership in accordance with the terms of this declaration.

Accordingly the United Kingdom, Canada, Australia, New Zealand, South Africa, India, Pakistan and Ceylon hereby declare that they remain united as free and equal members of the Commonwealth of Nations, freely co-operating in the pursuit of peace, liberty and progress.

Legacy 
The London Declaration marked the birth of the modern Commonwealth of Nations. Following the death of King George VI in 1952, the Commonwealth leaders recognised Queen Elizabeth II as Head of the Commonwealth.

See also
 Commonwealth of Nations membership criteria
London Declaration (disambiguation)

Footnotes

History of the Commonwealth of Nations
India and the Commonwealth of Nations
1949 in law
1949 in India
1949 in London
1949 in the United Kingdom
1949 in international relations
1949 documents
History of the foreign relations of India